Valeria Yuryevna Lazinskaya (born 10 December 1992, in Shakhtinsk, Kazakhstan) is a Kazakh naturalized Russian female freestyle wrestler. She won the bronze medal the 2014 World Wrestling Championships. In the gold medal match of 2015 European Games she won rematch World Champion Yuliya Tkach of Ukraine.

References 

Living people
Russian female sport wrestlers
European Games gold medalists for Russia
European Games medalists in wrestling
Wrestlers at the 2015 European Games
World Wrestling Championships medalists
1992 births
20th-century Russian women
21st-century Russian women